Vista High School is a public high school in Vista, California, United States. Vista is located in North San Diego County.  The Vista Unified School District encompasses a large geographic area.  As such, it serves the needs of students from the cities of Vista, Bonsall, San Marcos, Oceanside, and Carlsbad.  Vista High School is one of the largest schools in California, holding over 3,000 students, though its current campus was originally built in 1972 to educate 1,200 students. It was first established in 1936.

Academics
In 1982, VHS was the first high school in San Diego County to adopt the International Baccalaureate Program.

Athletics 
The school's football stadium is named after former coach Dick Haines, a successful Vista High coach who led the 1974 and 1985 Vista High School football teams to state championships. The Panthers have won the CIF championship nine times. To date, the school has produced five NFL players.

Notable alumni
 Russell Allen - Jacksonville Jaguars linebacker
 Sal Aunese- University of Colorado Quarterback
 Trevor Cahill - San Francisco Giants pitcher
 Michael Damian- singer, songwriter & actor.
 Travis Goethel - Oakland Raiders linebacker
 Lorena Gonzalez - State Assemblywoman for California's 80th State Assembly district
 Micheal Guy - In Fear and Faith keyboardist
 Leon Hall - Cincinnati Bengals cornerback
 Korey Lee - Houston Astros catcher
 Wes Littleton - Seattle Mariners pitcher
 Michael Lumpkin - Assistant Secretary of Defense, Special Operation and Low Intensity Conflict
 Clive Matson - Poet and Creative Writing Teacher
 Stefan McClure - Washington Redskins safety
 Carrie Prejean - Miss California USA 2009
 Cove Reber - Saosin lead singer
 Alan S. Thompson, retired U.S. Navy Vice Admiral and former Director of the U.S. Defense Logistics Agency
 Pisa Tinoisamoa - Chicago Bears linebacker
 Joey Bradford - The Used Lead Guitarist
 Nik Ewing - Local Natives Vocals, Bass, Keyboard

References 
 http://www.vistausd.org/history

External links 
School website

International Baccalaureate schools in California
High schools in San Diego County, California
1936 establishments in California
Educational institutions established in 1936
Public high schools in California
Vista, California